George Arthur Gill was an English professional footballer who made 196 appearances as a goalkeeper in the Football League and the North Eastern League for Hartlepools United.

Personal life 
Gill served in the Tyne Electrical Engineers during the First World War.

Career statistics

References 

English Football League players
Place of death missing
British Army personnel of World War I
English footballers
1894 births
Year of death missing
Footballers from Newcastle upon Tyne
Association football goalkeepers
Tyne Electrical Engineers soldiers
Hartlepool United F.C. players